Jessica Yeaton (born 21 November 1991) is an Australian cross-country skier who competes internationally.

She competed for Australia at the FIS Nordic World Ski Championships 2017 in Lahti, Finland.

She grew up at various places around the world, like Perth in Western Australia, Texas and Dubai before she at the aged at 12 settled in Alaska, became fascinated by the wintertime activities and began practice cross-country skiing.

Cross-country skiing results
All results are sourced from the International Ski Federation (FIS).

Olympic Games

World Championships

World Cup

Season standings

References

External links

1991 births
Living people
Australian female cross-country skiers
Sportspeople from Perth, Western Australia
Cross-country skiers at the 2018 Winter Olympics
Cross-country skiers at the 2022 Winter Olympics
Olympic cross-country skiers of Australia
Tour de Ski skiers
Competitors at the 2015 Winter Universiade